Gimelli is an Italian surname. Notable people with the surname include:

Cristiano Gimelli (born 1982), Italian footballer
Roberto Gimelli (born 1982), Italian footballer

See also
 Gemelli (disambiguation)

Italian-language surnames